William Wells Quatremain (22 December 1857 – 3 March 1930) was an English artist who painted many oil and watercolour landscapes of Britain, many of which were also published as postcards.

Quatremain produced a number of scenes from Warwickshire — like "The Ford, Kenilworth" and "Warwick Castle from the Avon" — and specifically from Stratford-upon-Avon, including "Shakespeare's Birthplace" and "Ann Hathaway's Cottage."

References

McFarland, Patricia. "William Wells Quatremain, a Stratford artist." Warwickshire History, Vol. 1 No. 6 (1971), pp. 25–31.

External links
Collections - W.W. Quatremain picture postcards "Collections" of Morecambe)
Old Clopton Bridge (Herbert Art Gallery)

19th-century English painters
English male painters
20th-century English painters
English watercolourists
Landscape artists
Postcard artists
People from Upper Norwood
1857 births
1930 deaths
20th-century English male artists
19th-century English male artists